Honey Wagon may refer to:

 Honeywagon (vehicle), a truck for collecting and carrying human excreta
 Vacuum truck, a tank truck with a vacuum designed to load material through suction lines
 Manure spreader, an agricultural machine used to distribute manure over a field as fertilizer

See also 
Honey dipper, a term of disparagement for those that work with honeywagons or do similar work.